WPRY (1400 AM) is a radio station broadcasting a classic hits format. Licensed to Perry, Florida, United States, the station is currently owned by Dockins Communications, Inc. WPRY also is heard on an FM translator at 95.3.

References

External links

PRY
Radio stations established in 1953
1964 establishments in Florida